The Williams FW23 was the car with which the Williams team competed in the 2001 Formula One World Championship. It was driven by German Ralf Schumacher, who was in his third year with the team, and Colombian Juan Pablo Montoya, a previous Formula 3000 and CART champion who was making his F1 début.

Overview

Car and season 
2001 was Williams' second year with engine partners BMW and the promise shown in  translated into raw speed and some good results throughout the year, including the team's first win since , at Imola.  The powerful engine, well-designed chassis, the Michelin tyres' tendency to work well in hot conditions and the efforts of two quick drivers resulted in a haul of four victories and the team's re-emergence at the top of the sport, alongside Ferrari and McLaren. The car was especially strong on faster circuits such as Hockenheim and Monza, where the BMW engine put Williams at a distinct advantage over their rivals.

However, Williams was not able to mount a title challenge, for several reasons. Firstly, the BMW engines were more unreliable than their rivals, resulting in a finishing rate of less than 50%. Secondly, in contrast to the faster circuits, the chassis was not as competitive on high-downforce tracks such as Monaco and the Hungaroring. Thirdly, both drivers made several mistakes, Montoya in particular as he came to terms with F1.

However, the team still finished a clear third in the Constructors' Championship, with 80 points.

A total of nine chassis were built.

Livery 
BMW Williams went into the 2001 season with renewed major sponsorships such as Allianz, Nortel Networks, Compaq, Reuters, Veltins, Petrobras and Castrol. BMW Williams received new sponsorship such as WorldCom and discontinued sponsorships are 11880.com. The livery was similar to the 2000 design with subtle changes. 

In free practice ahead of the 2001 San Marino Grand Prix, Williams jokingly painted their rear wing with a text saying "Keep Your Distance!" after several rear-end shunts in the opening races, most notably by Jos Verstappen on Montoya whilst leading in Brazil.

Gallery

Complete Formula One results
(key) (results in bold indicate pole position)

References

External links

Williams Formula One cars
2001 Formula One season cars